The 2016 West Georgia Wolves football team represented the University of West Georgia in the 2016 NCAA Division II football season. They were led by head coach Will Hall, who was in his third season at West Georgia. The Wolves played their home games at University Stadium and were members of the Gulf South Conference. They finished the season with a record of 7 wins and 4 losses (7–4 overall, 4–4 in the GSC), defeating one top 25 ranked team, ranked as high as #2 in the nation before falling in the middle of the season. West Georgia were not invited in the 2016 playoffs.

Schedule
West Georgia announced its 2016 football schedule on January 6, 2016. The schedule consists of 5 home and 6 away games in the regular season. The Wolves will host GSC foes Delta State, Florida Tech, Mississippi College, and West Alabama, and will travel to North Alabama, Shorter, Valdosta State, and West Florida.

The Wolves will host only one non-conference game against Catawba of the South Atlantic Conference and travel to two away games against Albany State and Miles both from the Southern Intercollegiate Athletic Conference.

References

West Georgia
West Georgia Wolves football seasons
West Georgia Wolves football